University of Bristol Boat Club is a rowing club on the River Avon based at the Saltford Rowing Centre, Bath Road, Saltford, Bristol.

History
The club was founded in 1909 and the boathouse is shared between the Avon County Rowing Club, Monkton Combe School Boat Club, Canoe Avon and the Bristol Empire Dragon Boat club.

The club won the prestigious Henley Prize at the Henley Regatta in 1991.

Henley Royal Regatta

References

Sport in Bristol
Rowing clubs in England
Rowing clubs of the River Avon